Maurice John Deville (born 31 July 1992) is a Luxembourgish professional footballer who plays as a forward for Swift Hesperange.

Early life 
Maurice Deville was born in 1992 in Sulingen, the son of a German mother and Luxembourg footballer Frank Deville. His parents later separated.

Career 
Deville has played club football in Germany for Alemannia Aachen II, SV Elversberg and 1. FC Saarbrücken.

He made his senior international debut for Luxembourg in 2011, and has also appeared in qualifying matches for the UEFA European Under-21 Football Championship.

In July 2014, he joined 1. FC Kaiserslautern to play for the U23 team, but a year later he was promoted to the first team and signed a professional contract in February 2016.

In August 2016, he went on loan to FSV Frankfurt until summer 2017.

He returned to Saarbrücken in August 2020.

On 24 August 2022, Deville returned to his childhood club Swift Hesperange.

Career statistics 

Scores and results list Luxembourg's goal tally first, score column indicates score after each Deville goal.

References

External links

1992 births
Living people
Luxembourgian people of German descent
German people of Luxembourgian descent
Luxembourgian footballers
German footballers
Association football forwards
Luxembourg international footballers
Luxembourg under-21 international footballers
Luxembourg youth international footballers
SV Elversberg players
1. FC Saarbrücken players
1. FC Kaiserslautern II players
1. FC Kaiserslautern players
FSV Frankfurt players
SV Waldhof Mannheim players
SV Sandhausen players
FC Swift Hesperange players
2. Bundesliga players
3. Liga players
Regionalliga players
Luxembourgian expatriate footballers